The Fath Medal (meaning Conquer Medal) is a military award of the Iranian armed forces which is awarded by Commander-in-chief, Supreme Leader of Iran. The medal is the likeness of three Palm leaves over Khorramshahr's grand mosque (as a symbol of resistance), Flag of Iran and the word "Fath".

The medal is awarded in three grades, typically based on the rank of the recipient.

Recipients 
According to Owain Raw-Rees, the medal is awarded in three grades.  Senior commanders are typically awarded a first class medal, Colonels and Brigadiers usually receive a second class award, while third class awards are granted to those ranked at or below Lieutenant Colonel.  However, these guidelines are not applied strictly.

The first recipient of the Order of Fath, First Class, was Mohammad Hossein Fahmideh, one of three to receive the honour on September 27, 1989.  Fahmideh's award was posthumous as he was killed in November 1980 when, as a 13-year-old boy, he was fighting in the Iran–Iraq War.  He disabled an Iraqi tank by jumping under it while wearing a belt of grenades from which he had removed the pins.  In so doing, Fahmideh halted the advance of a line of tanks.   Khomeini declared Fahmideh a national hero, stating that the "value of [Fahmideh's] little heart is greater than could be described by hundreds of tongues and hundreds of pens" and also calling him "our guide" who "threw himself under the enemy's tank with a grenade and destroyed it, thus drinking the elixir of matyrdom."  Khomeini's regime went on to provide a knapsack to every school child in Iran that showed "Fahmideh's heroic sacrifice under the tank and the grenades he used to blow himself up," and to include Fahmideh's story alongside that of other martyrs in textbooks intended to improve childhood literacy.

First recipients: 1989 
The first Order of Fath medals were conferred on September 27, 1989, after the Iran–Iraq War, with three recipients of the award at First Class level:
Mohammad Hossein Fahmideh, 13-year-old volunteer soldier of Basij (KIA in 1980)
Mohsen Rezaei, commander of Islamic Revolutionary Guard Corps
Ali Sayad Shirazi, commander of Islamic Republic of Iran Army
Alongside them, 21 people received 2nd class medal and 29 people received the 3rd class medal.

1990 
On February 4, 1990, a total of 210 men received the medal. Some of the recipients in the ceremony included:

Islamic Republic of Iran Air Force 
 Abbas Babaei (KIA, 2nd grade)
 Jalil Zandi (2nd grade)
 Mansour Sattari (2nd grade)
  Mohammad Daneshpour (2nd Grade)
 Massoud Monfared Niyaki (KIA, 2nd grade)
 Mostafa Ardestani (KIA, 2nd grade)

Army of the Guardians of the Islamic Revolution 
 Mohammad Ebrahim Hemmat (KIA, 2nd grade)
 Mehdi Bakeri (KIA, 2nd grade)
 Hossein Kharrazi (KIA, 2nd grade)
 Yahya Rahim Safavi (2nd grade)
 Mohammad Ali Jafari (3rd grade)
 Qasem Soleimani (3rd grade)
 Ahmad Kazemi (3rd grade)

Both 
 Ali Shamkhani (2nd grade)

2016
Ali Fadavi, commander of Iranian Revolutionary Guards, 1st grade.

2018
Habibollah Sayyari,  former commander of the Islamic Republic of Iran Navy, 1st grade.

Other famous recipients  
 Akbar Hashemi Rafsanjani (1st grade)
 Hassan Rouhani (2nd grade)
 Mohammad Pakpour (1st grade)

References

External links

Military awards and decorations of Iran
Awards established in 1989
Islamic awards